Geidt is a surname. Notable people with the surname include:

Christopher Geidt, Baron Geidt (born 1961), Private Secretary to Queen Elizabeth II
Jeremy Geidt (1930–2013), English-born American actor, comedian, and acting coach

See also
Geist (surname)